The United Basketball League is a spring semi-professional basketball league based in the Southern United States.

History 
Founded by Mac Claire in 2006 as the Regional Basketball League, the UBL began its inaugural season in the spring of 2008. With an aim to provide stable, family-friendly basketball teams for all to enjoy, the UBL presently consists of eight teams.

Teams

Former teams 
 Texas Capital Sounds / San Marcos Knights  (2006)
San Antonio Soul (2006)
 Arkansas Select (2009)
 Austin/Round Rock Rhythm (2012–13)
 Central Texas Stars (2008)
 East Tyler I-20 Pros (2009)
 Metroplex Lightning (2013)
 Mississippi Tornadoes (2011–13)
 Missouri Terrors (2013)
 New Mexico Power (2009)
 Oklahoma Impact (2008–11)
 On Point Hoops (2012)
 Springfield Thrill (2011–13)
 St. Louis Scorpions (2013)
 Texas Outlaws (2009)

Champions

See also
 List of developmental and minor sports leagues

References

External links 
 
UBL news at USbasket.com

 
Basketball leagues in the United States